"Fuego de Noche, Nieve de Día" (English: "Fire by Night, Snow by Day") is the fourth single from Ricky Martin's album, A Medio Vivir (1995). It was released as a promotional single in the United States on April 16, 1996.

A music video was shot by Gustavo Garzón in February 1996 in Mexico. It was included on La Historia DVD in 2001 and 17 DVD in 2008.

The music video tells the tragic love story of a young man (portrayed by Martin) and a young woman (portrayed by the Mexican actress Kate del Castillo) who is insane and locked in a bedlam. The story finishes with that woman's death, which makes the man feel so sad that he kills himself.

The song reached number twelve on the Latin Pop Airplay in the United States.

Formats and track listings
Mexican promotional CD single
"Fuego de Noche, Nieve de Día" – 5:30

Italian promotional 7" single
"Fuego de Noche, Nieve de Día" (Edit) – 4:21

Charts

Weekly charts

Year-end charts

References

External links

1996 singles
Ricky Martin songs
Spanish-language songs
Songs written by K. C. Porter
Songs written by Luis Gómez Escolar
Pop ballads
1995 songs
Sony Discos singles
Columbia Records singles
Song recordings produced by K. C. Porter
Songs written by Draco Rosa